John Atkinson (3 April 1948 – 7 September 2022) was an Australian rules footballer who played with Fitzroy in the Victorian Football League (VFL).

Notes

External links 
		

Living people
1948 births
Australian rules footballers from Victoria (Australia)
Fitzroy Football Club players